A Place in England is a novel by Melvyn Bragg, first published in 1970. It is the second part of Bragg's Cumbrian Trilogy.

The story is set predominantly in Thurston (Bragg's name for Wigton), from the 1920s to the 1960s, and follows the life of Joseph Tallentire, a labourer, footman, and eventually publican. Joseph is the son of John Tallentire, the central character of Bragg's The Hired Man, and father of Douglas Tallentire, central character of Kingdom Come.

1970 British novels
Novels by Melvyn Bragg
Novels set in Cumbria
Secker & Warburg books